Léonel Beaudoin (September 13, 1924 – July 28, 2021) was a Canadian politician and insurance agent.

Born in Cookshire, Quebec in September 1924, Beaudoin was elected to the House of Commons of Canada in the 1968 federal election as a Member of the Ralliement Créditiste to represent the riding of Richmond. After that party merged with the Social Credit Party of Canada, he was re-elected as a Social Credit candidate in the 1972 and 1974 federal elections. He ran unsuccessfully in the 1965 election in the riding of Richmond—Wolfe. He was a member of various standing committees.

Beaudoin died in Bromptonville, Quebec in July 2021 at the age of 96.

References

External links
 

1924 births
2021 deaths
French Quebecers
Canadian Army personnel of World War II
Canadian Army soldiers
Members of the House of Commons of Canada from Quebec
Social Credit Party of Canada MPs
People from Estrie